2009 European Youth Olympic Festival may refer to:

2009 European Youth Summer Olympic Festival
2009 European Youth Olympic Winter Festival